Li Baotian (born November 1946) is a Chinese actor. Li is a member of China Television Artists Association and China Film Association.

His career accolades include one Flying Apsaras Award, six China Golden Eagle Awards, and two Hundred Flowers Awards.

Life

Early life
Li was born in Jiawang District of Xuzhou city, Jiangsu province in November 1946, during the Chinese Civil War, with his ancestral home in Wendeng, Shandong.

In February 1960, Li entered a local theatre to learn drama, he was transferred to Xuzhou Song and Dance Troupe in 1966, while the Cultural Revolution was launched by Mao Zedong, he learned to dance and sing for ten years.

Resumption of University Entrance Examination in 1977, Li he attended Central Academy of Drama in 1978, after graduating from 1981 he taught there.

Acting career
Li first came to the attention of the audience when he played a supporting role as Zhang Letian in Can Fan's film From Place to Place.

In 1985, Li starred in Wu Yinxun's comedy film The Wanderer and The Swan, which were highly praised by audience.

In 1987, Li was chosen to act as a support actor in Woman, Demon, Human, a film directed by Huang Shuqin, which garnered him a "Best Supporting Actor" at 8th China Golden Eagle Awards.

In 1988, Li participated in a TV series called Manager Ge, he was awarded for "Best Actor" at 8th Flying Apsaras Award.

In 1991, Li starred in Zhang Yimou's film Ju Dou as Yang Tianqing, alongside actress Gong Li.

In 1993, Li starred as President Yu in He Qun's film Country Teachers, which adapted from Liu Xinglong's novel of the same title, he won the Huabiao Award for Best Actor, Hundred Flowers Award for Best Actor and Golden Rooster Award for Best Actor.

In 1996, Li acted as Liu Yong in a historical television series Liu Luoguo, which earned him a China Golden Eagle Award for Best Actor.

Li won the "Best Supporting Actor" at the 1998 Hundred Flowers Awards for his performance in Keep Cool, and won the "Most Popular Actor" award at the 19th China Golden Eagle Awards for his performance in Policeman: Li Jiuping.

2003 proved to be a successful year for Li, he played the role of Xi Laile in a historical television series The Great Doctor: Xi Laile, for which he received nomination at the 2003 Flying Apsaras Award and won the two China Golden Eagle Awards.

For his role as Grandfather Zhi Gen in The Nightingale, Li won the Best Actor Award at the 1st Chinese Australian Film Festival.

In 2015, he was cast as Shi Changgong in the romantic drama film Forever Love, opposite Joe Chen, Sun Yizhou and Chrissie Chau.

On 18 October 2020, he won the Life Achievement TV Artist Award at the 30th China TV Golden Eagle Award.

In 2021, he co-starred with Ren Suxi in the film Miss Mom as the grandfather.

Works

Film

Television

Awards

References

External links
 

1946 births
People from Xuzhou
Central Academy of Drama alumni
Male actors from Jiangsu
Living people
20th-century Chinese male actors
21st-century Chinese male actors
Chinese male film actors
Chinese male television actors